The term West Syrian or Western Syrian may refer to:

 western parts of the modern state of Syria
 western parts of historical region of Syria
 West Syrian Rite, alternative term for the West Syriac Rite
 West Syrian script, imprecise term for the West Syriac script
 West Syrian dialects, imprecise term for the West Syriac dialects

See also
 East Syrian (disambiguation)
 Syria (disambiguation)
 Syrian (disambiguation)
 Syriac (disambiguation)
 West Syriac (disambiguation)
 Syriac Rite (disambiguation)